Danay Football Club is a Cameroonian football club based in Yagoua. It is a member of the Fédération Camerounaise de Football.

Football clubs in Cameroon
Sports clubs in Cameroon